Concord was launched at Dartmouth in 1807. From then until 1809 she traded widely. Between 1809 and 1812 two different histories emerged. The registers carried her as trading with North America. Other sources, however, have her sailing to the British Southern Whale Fishery as a sealer or whaler. She made three voyages between 1809 and 1816 in this capacity and then returned to trading. She was wrecked at the Cape of Good Hope in November 1816.

Career
Concord first appeared in Lloyd's Register (LR) in 1807 with Adams, master, Haniford, owner, and trade Dartmouth–London.

The registers
The registers were only as accurate as owners chose to keep them. In Concords case accuracy does not appear to have been a priority.

Whaler
Between 1809 and 1816, her owner was Alexander Birnie.

1st whaling/sealing voyage (1809–1811): Captain Thomas (or James) Garbutt (or Garbut) sailed from London on 23 November 1809. Concord sailed from Portsmouth on 14 January, bound for New Holland. She arrived at Port Jackson from London on 28 June 1810 with "sundries". She sailed on 31 July, bound for Rio de Janeiro and the Cape of Good Hope. She arrived at the Cape on 8 December. She returned to Port Jackson on 19 February 1811 with sundries. She then sailed on 9 March to go seal hunting. She arrived at Macquarie island in April. She left a sealing gang and returned to Port Jackson on 1 May. She sailed again for Macquarie on 1 June,  arriving there on 12 July. She returned to Port Jackson on 5 October with seal skins. She next sailed on 14 November for Macquarie Island. While she was sealing off the west side of the island on 24 January 1812 one of her boats overturned and six men were drowned.  She left Macquarie Island on 10 March, bound for England with 13,700 skins and 50 tons of seal oil. From Macquarie Island she sailed via Campbell Island. Concord was under the command of Captain Jarvis when she arrived at Gravesend from the South Seas on 15 September 1812; a week earlier she had arrived at Falmouth.

2nd whaling voyage (1812–1814): Captain William Elder sailed from England in October 1812. Concord arrived at Port Jackson from London on 13 July 1813, carrying merchandise. She left on 19 September for the sperm whale fishery. She was reported to have engaged in whaling around Norfolk Island.

3rd whaling voyage (1814–1816): Captain William Elder sailed in 1814. Concord, Elder, master, arrived at the Cape on 26 September 1815 from Timor. She returned to England on 20 February 1816 with 300 casks of sperm oil.

The Register of Shipping for 1816 showed Concord with Scott, master and owner, and trade London–Cape of Good Hope. On 21 July 1816 Concord, Scott, master, arrived back at Gravesend from the Cape.

Fate
Concord, Scott, master, sailing from London, arrived on 4 November 1816 at Table Bay, Cape of Good Hope. There a violent storm almost immediately drove her and Woodbridge on shore. Passengers and crew were rescued, and part of the cargo was saved, though greatly damaged. By 5 November Concord was a complete loss.

Notes

Citations

References
 
 
 
 
 

1807 ships
Age of Sail merchant ships of England
Sealing ships
Whaling ships
Maritime incidents in 1816